Hattusili I (Ḫattušili I) was a king of the Hittite Old Kingdom. He reigned ca. 1650–1620 BCE (middle chronology), or 1586–1556 BCE (short chronology). Excavations in Zincirli Höyük, Southern Turkey, suggest that Hattusili I destroyed a complex at that site in the mid to late 17th century BCE, which can confirm the middle chronology dating for his reign. This event could have been part of his campaign against Zalpa in order to disrupt an exchange network connected to Aleppo that previously linked the Euphrates, North Syria, and Central Anatolia.

He used the title of Labarna at the beginning of his reign. It is uncertain whether he is the second king so identified, making him Labarna II, or whether he is identical to Labarna I, who is treated as his predecessor in Hittite chronologies.

During his reign, he moved the capital from Neša (Kaneš, near modern Kültepe) to Ḫattuša (near modern Boğazkale), taking the throne name of Ḫattušili to mark the occasion.

He is the earliest Hittite ruler for whom contemporary records have been found. In addition to "King of Ḫattuša", he took the title "Man of Kuššara", a reference to the prehistoric capital and home of the Hittites, before they had occupied Neša.

Annals of Ḫattušili I

A cuneiform tablet found in 1957 written in both the Hittite and the Akkadian language, known as Annals of Hattusili I, provides details of five years of his reign, and is considered by Trevor R. Bryce as a copy, after the lifetime of this king, written in 13th century BCE.
In it, he claims to have extended the Hittite domain to the sea. In the first year of campaign he reached the cities of Sanahuitta and Zalpa, he failed to conquer the former but sacked the later. And in the second year, he claimed to have subdued Alalakh and other cities in Syria, located west of Euphrates and north of Carchemish, which were allied to Yamhad kingdom. In the third year, he campaigned against Arzawa in western Anatolia, as the Annals only say he: "went to the land of Arzawa and took away its cattle and sheep." In the fourth year, he finally captured Sanahuitta after five months of siege. In the fifth year, the last of his campaigns, the Annals recorded a long list of conquered cities and lands when he crossed the Euphrates, claiming that no one did it before but king Sargon of Akkad, who crossed the river in the opposite direction.

Last Days

The end of his reign is of historical importance because of his Succession Proclamation. This document, written in first person, tells of Ḫattušili coming back wounded from his last military campaign. On his deathbed he is enraged by the attitude of his heir and how he is conspiring with his mother and cousins. Ḫattušili then explains that for these reasons Mursili, his grandson, will be the next king instead, and urges the army and public servants to obey him. 

The arguments are in a tablet, classified as CTH 6, also known as the "Testament of Hattusili I," in which he rejects his nephew as his successor, and designates his grandson Mursili I to occupy the throne. This Testament as well as the Annals survived only as a late 13th century BCE copy.

This apparently worked since Mursili indeed became king and continued Ḫattušili's military campaigns, finally conquering Aleppo and sacking Babylon.

See also

 History of the Hittites

References

External links
Reign of Hattusili I

Hittite kings
16th-century BC rulers